Fannie is a given name. Notable people with the name include:

 Fannie B. Damon (1857-1939), American writer, magazine editor
 Fannie B. Linderman (1875-1960), British-born American teacher, entertainer, and writer
 Fannie Barrier Williams (1855–1944), African American educator, political and women's rights activist
 Fannie Barrios, Venezuelan bodybuilder
 Fannie Bloomfield Zeisler (1863–1927), Austrian-born American pianist
 Fannie C. Williams (1882–1980), American educator
 Fannie E. Motley, American schoolteacher and president of the National Association of Teachers in Colored Schools
 Fannie Farmer (1857–1915), American culinary expert and author
 Fannie Fern Andrews (1867–1950), American lecturer, teacher, social worker and writer
 Fannie Flagg (born 1944), American actress, comedian and author
Fannie Gaston-Johansson (born 1938), American professor of nursing
 Fannie Heaslip Lea (1884–1955), American author and poet
 Fannie Hillsmith (1911–2007), American cubist painter
 Fannie Hurst (1885–1968), American novelist
 Fannie Kauffman (1924–2009), a Mexican comedian and actress
 Fannie Lee Chaney (1921–2007), American baker turned civil rights activist
 Fannie Lou Hamer (1917–1977), American voting rights activist
 Fannie Nampeyo (1900–1987), American potter
 Fannie Hardy Eckstorm (1865–1946), American writer, ornithologist and folklorist
 Fannie Porter (1873–c.1940), American brothel owner
 Fannie M. Richards (1840–1922), American educator
 Fannie Salter (1883–1966), American lighthouse keeper
 Fannie Sellins (1872–1919), American union organizer
 Fannie Ward (1872–1952), vaudeville and silent film actress

See also
 Fannie Bay, Northern Territory, a middle/inner suburb of the city of Darwin, Australia
 Fannie L. Daugherty (skipjack), a  two-sail bateau
 Fannie Mae, a stockholder-owned corporation
 Fannie May, a brand of chocolates owned by 1-800-Flowers
 Short Fat Fannie, a single by Larry Williams

See also
 Fanny (given name)

Feminine given names